The St. Paul Colored Gophers was a small club of black baseball players formed in St. Paul, Minnesota, in 1907. They were not a formal Negro league team, as the commonly referred-to "Negro leagues" were not created until 1920. However, like other barnstorming teams of the time, they put considerable pressure on the desegregation of baseball. Historians rarely mention the Colored Gophers in Negro baseball history, and statistics are hard to find.

History 

The club lasted several seasons,  also playing under the name Twin City Gophers and Minneapolis Gophers.

In 1909, the Colored Gophers defeated what was considered to be the most powerful Negro baseball team, the Leland Giants. They were managed that year by Phil "Daddy" Reid and Irving Williams, they managed to land Taylor brothers Candy Jim Taylor and Steel Arm Johnny Taylor. Candy Jim went on to manage the team in 1910.

Rosters

1907

1908

1909

1910

1911 
Played as the Twin City Gophers.

1913
Played as the "St. Paul Gophers".

1914
Played as the "Minneapolis Gophers".

1916
Played as the "Minneapolis Gophers".

MLB throwback jerseys 

The Minnesota Twins have honored the club by wearing replica throwback jerseys of the team.
The Twins wore 1909 Gophers uniforms at home against Cleveland on July 13, 1997.
They wore Gophers uniforms on July 10, 2005, in Kansas City against the Royals, and again on both July 21, 2012 and June 23, 2019.
On August 7, 2010, the Twins featured the Gophers uniforms in a game against the Cleveland Indians at Progressive Field. The Indians wore the Negro League's Cleveland Buckeyes 1946 replica jerseys. Announcers carefully referred to the jerseys as the Saint Paul Gophers, leaving out the word colored.

References

Further reading
Peterson, Todd, Early Black Baseball in Minnesota: The St. Paul Gophers, Minneapolis Keystones and Other Barnstorming Teams of the Deadball Era.  McFarland & Company, 2010. ; 

  Whirty, Ryan, "For One Shining Season in 1909, the Eyes of Baseball Were on St. Paul's Black Baseball Team" City Pages, April 1, 2015

External links
"seamheads.com" 1908–1911 St. Paul Colored Gophers team stats

Negro league baseball teams
Sports in Saint Paul, Minnesota
Defunct baseball teams in Minnesota
Baseball teams disestablished in 1913
Baseball teams established in 1907